Daa laang refers to a night-time meal in Hong Kong cuisine. First emerging in the 1950s, it includes hot and cold Chiuchowese dishes.

Origins 
Daa laang originated from Chiu Chow (Teochiu, Teochew) and is also called Chiu Chow Daa laang. It was then spread into Hong Kong by immigrants from Chiu Chow in the 1950s.The traditional way to order the food is to choose the dish of choice in front of a server, who then marks it down for customers. The Daa Laang is then made and sent to the table. Due to its convenience and unique taste, the traditional dish is fast expanding into other parts of the country, including Shenzhen.

Etymology 
The term is Cantonese and originated in Hong Kong. There are several proposed etymologies.

Proposed etymologies 
 In the fiction of the Sung dynasty and Yuen dynasty, terms such as “da tsim” (Chinese: 打尖; Yale: dá jìm, Jyutping: daa2 zim1) and “da dim” (Chinese: 打店; Yale: dá dim, Jyutping: daa2dim3), refere to going to a restaurant for dinner while traveling. Hence, the word “Daa” can refer to eating at a restaurant. In the Teochew dialect, the word “lang” means "people." Thus, Cantonese refer to the Teochew people as “lang lo” (Chinese: 冷佬; Yale: làang lóu, Jyutping: laang5 lou2). Over time, "laang lo" became a slang term, regarding Chiuchowese food stalls. Then gradually the term daa laang referenced dinner at Hong Kong’s Chiuchowese stalls.

 In the 1950s, there were many Teochew people selling late-night supper and marinated food on Hong Kong’s streets. They used to carry baskets with poles on their shoulders and then peddled along the streets. They were called the “basket carriers”. The pronunciation of this term in Chiuchowese–Swatowese is like “daa laang”, so then Hong Kong people call them the daa laangs. In time, “daa laang” became the term that represents eating Teochew cuisine in Hong Kong.
 At that period, many gangs dined and dashed at the Chiuchowese stalls. A Chiuchowese gang formed in response to watch for the rival gangs. Once they found someone who came for a meal, they would yell “hit them!” to alert others. “daa laang” in Teochew dialect means "hit them", thus gradually people related daa laang and Chiuchowese cuisine together.

Dishes 
Dishes include a variety of cold cuts and spicy dishes originating from the food stalls in Chiu Chow. Marinated food, seafood, pickled products, and cooked dishes are the four main types of Daa Laang. 

One popular dish is the marinated or Chiu Chow soy-sauce goose. People usually order marinated tofu and cuttlefish together with the goose or directly order a marinated combination.

Pepper and salt fried food served with chili is also popular. Chefs will first fry the particular food (usually a light food like tofu or squid) and then re-fry it with pepper and salt.

Popular hot items include oyster congee, which also adds chopped meat and dried flatfish into the congee; pan fried oyster cake, adding oyster meat into an egg and frying it; lemon flat head mullet, adding lemon pieces into the mullet and steaming; Chinese kale and beef served with special Satai sauce.

Popular cold items include iced cockle - a first boiled and then frozen cockle which is served with a sauce made with garlic, sugar and vinegar - and iced crab, which is first boiled and later frozen.

References 

Hong Kong cuisine
Chinese cuisine